"Hero of the Day" is a power ballad by American heavy metal band Metallica from their 1996 album Load. The song was recorded on December 13, 1995, at Plant Studios in Sausalito, California. "Hero of the Day" was Metallica's second single release from the album. The song became their second consecutive number-one hit on the US Billboard Hot Mainstream Rock Tracks chart and reached number two in Australia, number three in Finland and number eight in Norway. The song is one of the few Metallica songs written primarily in a major key. A promotional video for the track was also filmed.

The "Hero of the Day" single is notable for including four Motörhead cover songs, recorded live direct to two-track at The Plant Studios during a rehearsal for Lemmy's 50th Birthday Party at Los Angeles' Whisky a Go Go nightclub. These B-sides were later released on the second CD of the Garage Inc. compilation in 1998.

History
According to an article in the rock music magazine Kerrang, around the time of Load'''s release, the demo for the song was entitled "Mouldy" due to the main riff reminding James Hetfield and Lars Ulrich of a typical Bob Mould sound. The demo was recorded on December 10, 1994, one of the earliest demo recordings for the Load sessions (the first demo to be recorded was for "Wasting My Hate" on November 28, 1994).<ref>[https://www.metallica.com/releases/other/release-4259.html metallica.com: releases]</ref>

Critical reception
Discussing the style of the song, Loudwire opined "Hero of the Day" to be a "mellifluous saunter into soft rock territory". Terry Bezer of Louder Sound called the song "epic".

Music video
The music video for this song was directed by Anton Corbijn and features a drug-addled youth watching a television, with every channel featuring Metallica in some way. A Western movie titled Load is featured, starring Newsted and Hetfield, followed by a boxing match with Hetfield as coach, and Newsted and Kirk Hammett as the fighters. After a drink called "Load" is advertised by Ulrich and Hetfield in matching suits, a game show called "Hero of the Day" (which is a parody of Jeopardy!) is seen being played of which Jason Newsted is the host. Then, it cuts to the news with the anchorman played by Hammett and featuring a clip of Hetfield singing the lyrics to the song. A girl calls at the youth's house and they later try having sex, but the young man is unaroused, and leans back in his bed, visibly disappointed. The girl later leaves. At the end, the youth passes out, and dreams of tiny robot creatures, rendered in stop motion, emerging from his ear. He awakes from the dream and vomits into his toilet.

Track listings

Charts and certifications

Weekly charts

Year-end charts

Certifications

References

1996 singles
1996 songs
American soft rock songs
Black-and-white music videos
Elektra Records singles
Metallica songs
Music videos directed by Anton Corbijn
Song recordings produced by Bob Rock
Songs written by James Hetfield
Songs written by Kirk Hammett
Songs written by Lars Ulrich
Vertigo Records singles